There are 24 named waterfalls in Ricketts Glen State Park in the U.S. state of Pennsylvania along Kitchen Creek as it flows in three steep, narrow valleys, or glens. The park, which opened in 1944, is administered by the Bureau of State Parks of the Pennsylvania Department of Conservation and Natural Resources (DCNR). Nearly all of the waterfalls are visible from the Falls Trail, which Ricketts had built from 1889 to 1893 and which the state park rebuilt in the 1940s and late 1990s. The Falls Trail has been called "the most magnificent hike in the state" and one of "the top hikes in the East".

The waterfalls are on the section of Kitchen Creek that flows down the Allegheny Front, a steep escarpment between the Allegheny Plateau to the north and the Ridge-and-Valley Appalachians to the south. The glens are made of sedimentary rocks from the Huntley Mountain and Catskill Formations that formed up to 370 million years ago in the Devonian and Carboniferous periods. The waterfalls are the result of increased flow in Kitchen Creek from glaciers enlarging its drainage basin during the last Ice Age.

Ricketts named 21 of the waterfalls, mostly for Native American tribes and places, and his family and friends. There are ten named falls in Ganoga Glen, eight named falls in Glen Leigh, and between four and six named waterfalls in Ricketts Glen. The DCNR names 22 falls, the United States Geological Survey (USGS) Geographic Names Information System (GNIS) names 23 falls, and Scott E. Brown's 2004 book Pennsylvania waterfalls: a guide for hikers and photographers names 24. The falls are described in order going upstream along the creek for each of the three glens.

Geology

The waterfalls in Ricketts Glen State Park are on the Allegheny Front, which is the boundary between the Allegheny Plateau to the north and the Ridge-and-Valley Appalachians to the south. Much of this drop occurs in Glen Leigh and Ganoga Glen, two narrow valleys carved by branches of Kitchen Creek, which come together at Waters Meet. The branch in Glen Leigh has eight named waterfalls and lies north of the confluence, while the branch in Ganoga Glen has ten named waterfalls and lies to the northwest. Ricketts Glen lies south of and downstream from Waters Meet; here the terrain becomes less steep, and there are fewer named waterfalls. The DCNR names only four in Ricketts Glen, all on Kitchen Creek; the USGS GNIS names these and one more on the creek, and Brown's book on Pennsylvania waterfalls adds a sixth named falls on a tributary.

The rocks exposed in the park were formed between 370 and 340 million years ago, when the land was part of the coastline of a shallow sea that covered a great portion of what is now North America. The high mountains to the east of the sea gradually eroded, causing a build-up of sediment made up primarily of clay, sand and gravel. Tremendous pressure on the sediment caused the formation of the rocks that are found in the park and in the Kitchen Creek drainage basin: sandstone, shale, siltstone, and conglomerates.

About 300 to 250 million years ago, the Allegheny Plateau, Allegheny Front, and Appalachian Mountains all formed in the Alleghanian orogeny. This happened long after the sedimentary rocks in the park were deposited, when the part of Gondwana that became Africa collided with what became North America, forming Pangaea. At least three major glaciations in the past million years have been the final factor in shaping the land that makes up the park today.

The effects of glaciation have made Kitchen Creek "unique compared to all other nearby streams that flow down the Allegheny Front", as it is the only one with an "almost continuous series of waterfalls".  Prior to the last ice age, Kitchen Creek and Phillips Creek to the east had drainage basins of similar area and slope, and both watersheds were confined to the Allegheny Front. This changed when receding glaciers formed temporary dams on two of Kitchen Creek's neighboring streams on the Allegheny Plateau, South Branch Bowman Creek to the northeast and Big Run, a tributary of Fishing Creek to the northwest. The headwaters of South Branch Bowman Creek were very close to those for the Glen Leigh branch of Kitchen Creek, and the headwaters for Big Run were very close to those for the Ganoga Glen branch.

As the glaciers retreated to the northeast about 20,000 years ago, glacial lakes formed. Drainage from the melting glacier and lakes cut a sluiceway, or channel, that diverted the headwaters of South Branch Bowman Creek into the Glen Leigh branch of Kitchen Creek. Instead water from Ganoga Lake and the area that later became Lake Jean was diverted into the Ganoga Glen branch of Kitchen Creek.

The result was increased water flow in Kitchen Creek, which has been cutting the falls in the glens since. The gradient or slope of Kitchen Creek was fairly stable for its flow when it had a much smaller drainage basin, as Phillips Creek still does. The increased basin size means that Kitchen Creek in the glens is too steep for its present amount of water flow. As Kitchen Creek continues to cut into the rock and erode it up the Allegheny Front, the creek's slope will decrease and become less steep. In the future, the creek's flow and slope are predicted to become similar to those of other nearby creeks with similar size drainage basins. This process could take so long that a new glacial period might occur before the transformation is complete.

Formations and falls

The park's waterfalls expose two distinct rock formations from the Devonian and Carboniferous periods. The higher and more recent of these is the Huntley Mountain Formation, from the late Devonian and early Mississippian. This is made of layers of olive green to gray sandstone and gray to red shale. The lower and older layer is the Catskill Formation, which is composed of red shale and siltstone up to 370 million years old. The harder Huntley Mountain Formation caps the Allegheny Front and has kept it from eroding as much as the softer Catskill Formation to the south. The portions of the Allegheny Front within the park are named North Mountain and Red Rock Mountain, with the latter name coming from an exposed band of Huntley Formation red shale and sandstone visible along Pennsylvania Route 487.

Geologists classify the falls at Ricketts Glen State Park into two types. Wedding-cake falls descend in a series of small steps, forming waterfalls that are said to resemble a wedding cake. Within the park, this type of falls usually flows over thin layers of Huntley Mountain Formation sandstone. In bridal-veil falls, the second type, water falls over a ledge and drops vertically into a plunge pool in the stream bed below. Within the park, this type of falls flows over Catskill Formation rocks or the red shale and sandstone of the Huntley Formation. In the park, the harder caprock which forms the ledge from which the bridal-veil falls drops is grey sandstone. The softer red shale below is eroded away by water, sand and gravel to form the plunge pool.

While the official Ricketts Glen State Park web page also classifies waterfalls as either the bridal-veil or wedding-cake type, Brown's Pennsylvania waterfalls: a guide for hikers and photographers uses four types for classification: falls, cascade, slide, and chute. The first, falls, is the same as the DCNR's bridal-veil type, with water that falls freely from a ledge. Brown divides the wedding-cake class into three types: cascade, where water falls down a "vertical to nearly vertical" surface that has terraces; slide, where water falls down a "near vertical to less than vertical" wide surface that is smoother than a cascade; and chute, where the water is confined by rock as it falls down "a narrow slide or cataractlike feature".

History

Ricketts Glen State Park is in the Susquehanna River drainage basin, the earliest recorded inhabitants of which were the Iroquoian-speaking Susquehannocks. Their numbers were greatly reduced by disease and warfare with the Five Nations of the Iroquois, and by 1675 they had died out, moved away, or been assimilated into other tribes. After this, the lands of the Susquehanna valley were under the nominal control of the Iroquois, who encouraged displaced tribes from the east to settle there, including the Shawnee and Lenape (or Delaware).

On November 5, 1768, the British acquired land, known in Pennsylvania as the New Purchase, from the Iroquois in the Treaty of Fort Stanwix; this included what is now Ricketts Glen State Park. After the American Revolutionary War, Native Americans almost entirely left Pennsylvania. Luzerne County was formed in 1786 from part of Northumberland County, and Fairmount Township, where the waterfalls are, was settled in 1792 and incorporated in 1834. About 1890 a Native American pot, decorated in the style of "the peoples of the Susquehanna region", was found under a rock ledge on Kitchen Creek by Murray Reynolds, for whom a waterfall is named.

By 1852 they had built a stone house on the lake shore, which they ran "as a lodge and tavern". Elijah's son Robert Bruce Ricketts, for whom the park is named, joined the Union Army as a private at the outbreak of the American Civil War and rose through the ranks to become a colonel.

Ricketts and the other settlers living in the area were not aware of the glens and their waterfalls until about 1865, when they were discovered by two of the Ricketts' guests who went fishing and wandered down Kitchen Creek. In 1872 Ricketts built a three-story wooden addition to the stone house; this opened as the North Mountain House hotel in 1873, and was run by Ricketts' brother Frank until 1898.

Ricketts named 21 of the waterfalls; most have Native American names, and others are named for relatives and friends. In 1879 Ricketts started the North Mountain Fishing Club, and he renamed Long Pond as Ganoga Lake in 1881, based on a suggestion by Pennsylvania senator Charles R. Buckalew. Ricketts also used the name Ganoga for the tallest waterfall and the glen it flows through. In 1889 Ricketts hired Matt Hirlinger and five other men to build the trails along Kitchen Creek. It took them four years to complete the trails and stone steps through the glens.  The wooden addition to the stone house was torn down in 1897, and the hotel and fishing club closed in 1903; the stone house remained the Ricketts' summer home.

Ricketts was a lumberman who made his fortune clearcutting nearly all his land, but the glens were "saved from the lumberman's axe through the foresight of the Ricketts family". Ricketts died in 1918; between 1920 and 1924 the Pennsylvania Game Commission bought  from his heirs, via the Central Pennsylvania Lumber Company. This became most of Pennsylvania State Game Lands Number 13, west of the park in Sullivan County. These sales left the Ricketts heirs with over  surrounding Ganoga Lake, Lake Jean and the glens. The area was approved as a national park site in the 1930s, and the National Park Service planned a Civilian Conservation Corps camp at "Ricketts Glynn" (sic). Budget problems and World War II brought an end to national plans for development.

In 1942 the Commonwealth of Pennsylvania bought , including the glens and their waterfalls, from the heirs for $82,000. Ricketts Glen State Park opened in 1944. A 1947 newspaper article estimated that the new park would have 50,000 visitors that year, and detailed the work the state had done since acquiring the land. The Falls Trail through the glens was rebuilt, all the stone steps were replaced, and signs were added. Out of concern for greater safety, footbridges with handrails replaced those made from hewn logs, overhanging rock ledges were removed in places, and the trail was rerouted near some falls. The Evergreen Trail past Adams Falls was built at this time.

In 1969 the Glens Natural Area was named a National Natural Landmark, and it became a Pennsylvania State Park Natural Area in 1993, which guarantees it "will be protected and maintained in a natural state". In 1996 heavy rains washed out two bridges on the Falls Trail; because of the difficulty of transporting materials on the trail, an Army National Guard helicopter dropped  poles into the glens to rebuild the bridges in early 1997. In the winter of 1997 ice climbing was allowed in the Ganoga Glen section of the park for the first time. That same year local fire companies trained to rescue people injured in the park when icy conditions make reaching and transporting them treacherous. In 1998 a four-year project to "repair and improve the Falls Trail" began, with three park employees carrying materials in on foot to stabilize the trail, fix steps, reduce erosion, and repair some bridges. In 2001, John Young in Hike Pennsylvania: An Atlas of Pennsylvania's Greatest Hiking Adventures wrote of the Falls Trail: "This is not only the most magnificent hike in the state, but it ranks up there with the top hikes in the East." The readers of Backpacker magazine chose the Falls Trail as the best hike in Pennsylvania in 2009, and as one of the best hikes in the Northeast in 2010.

Overview

Kitchen Creek flows through the park's three glens, which the descriptions of the waterfalls are organized by: Ricketts Glen, Glen Leigh, and Ganoga Glen. The falls are listed in order going upstream along Kitchen Creek, starting with the southernmost and ending at the northernmost in each glen. This is also the order in which a hiker would encounter the falls while traveling north along the creek on the Falls Trail.

The Falls Trail is a  loop hike. Turning southeast, it is  through Ganoga Glen back to Waters Meet, then the  through Ricketts Glen is retraced, but heading south back to PA 118.

The description of each waterfall starts with the name. While the Pennsylvania Department of Conservation and Natural Resources (DCNR) Bureau of State Parks names 22 waterfalls in Ricketts Glen State Park (all but Kitchen Creek and Shingle Cabin), the United States Geological Survey (USGS) Geographic Names Information System (GNIS) names 23 (all but Shingle Cabin), and Scott E. Brown's 2004 book Pennsylvania waterfalls: a guide for hikers and photographers names 24. There are also several unnamed waterfalls in the park, with the total number of falls given as 33 or 34. For each waterfall the height is given next, followed by the elevation above sea level, and the latitude and longitude. Each waterfall in the table is classified according to the four types used in Brown's book (falls, cascade, slide, and chute), with some classified as combinations of types. For each waterfall there are notes, which can give more information on the waterfall, the etymology of the name, and the location on the Falls Trail, followed by a photograph.

Ricketts Glen

Ricketts Glen is the name given to the Kitchen Creek valley south and downstream of Waters Meet. The three northernmost waterfalls are all within  of Waters Meet, and are only a short hike from the bottom of Ganoga Glen or Glen Leigh. The southern part of this glen has large areas of old-growth forest, chiefly hemlocks. Ricketts Glen is entirely in the Catskill Formation and all of the falls on this section of Kitchen Creek have plunge pools.

Ricketts Glen is the only glen where sources differ on the number of named waterfalls. Only Brown's book names Shingle Cabin Falls, which is the sole named falls in the park on a tributary of Kitchen Creek. The names of the waterfalls at the southern end of Ricketts Glen, under and just south of PA 118, are the most disputed. The USGS GNIS names Kitchen Creek Falls (with coordinates very near the PA 118 bridge) and Adams Falls (with coordinates further south of PA 118). A 1947 newspaper article on the new state park notes the unnamed falls under the highway bridge and refers to "Adam's Falls a short distance away". However, the DCNR Pennsylvania Trail of Geology guide to the park says Kitchen Creek Falls is just another name for Adams Falls, and notes that "At the bridge on Pa. Route 118, Kitchen Creek plunges over three picturesque cascades (18, 25 and 10 feet high)" (5.5, 7.6, and 3.0 m high).

Glen Leigh

Marcia Bonta in Outbound Journeys in Pennsylvania: A Guide to Natural Places for Individual and Group Outings calls this "the loveliest part of the entire trail—rugged, steep Glen Leigh". Bonta goes on to note that Glen Leigh "resembles a remote wilderness, hemmed in on one side by rock and on the other by surging water, and it has some of the most spectacular waterfalls in the park".

Glen Leigh was named for Lake Leigh, which R. B. Ricketts named for his second daughter Frances Leigh (1881–1970). She married William S. McLean, Jr., a judge, in 1921. Leigh was also the middle name of R.B. Ricketts' mother, Margaret Leigh Lockart Ricketts (1810–1891).  In 1907, R. B. Ricketts built a dam upstream of the waterfalls on the Glen Leigh branch of Kitchen Creek, hoping to use the resulting Lake Leigh for hydroelectric power generation. The dam was "poorly constructed" and could not be used to generate power; it was condemned by the state and the lake drained in 1956. Almost all of Glen Leigh is in the Huntley Mountain Formation, but a small region at the southern end, including Waters Meet, is in the Catskill Formation.

The Highland Trail is the  path between the northern ends of Glen Leigh and Ganoga Glen. It meets the Falls Trail just north of Onondaga Falls and has a short connector to F. L. Ricketts, the next waterfall south. The Falls Trail by both of these northernmost waterfalls had to be rebuilt in the early 2000s.

Ganoga Glen

By 1875 Ricketts had named the tallest waterfall on Kitchen Creek Ganoga Falls, and in 1881, he renamed Long Pond as Ganoga Lake. Pennsylvania senator Charles R. Buckalew suggested the name Ganoga, an Iroquoian word which he said meant "water on the mountain" in the Seneca language. Donehoo's A History of the Indian Villages and Place Names in Pennsylvania identifies it as a Cayuga language word meaning "place of floating oil" and the name of a Cayuga village in New York. Whatever the meaning, Ganoga Lake is the source of the branch of Kitchen Creek that flows through Ganoga Glen, which has the tallest waterfall.

A dam was built upstream of the waterfalls on the Ganoga Glen branch of Kitchen Creek in 1842. Ricketts strengthened the dam circa 1905 as part of a hydroelectric power generation scheme, and renamed the body of water Lake Rose (Rose is a Ricketts family name). However, both the Lake Rose and Lake Leigh dams were "poorly constructed" and could not be used to generate power; both dams were condemned by the state and Lake Rose was drained in 1969. Ganoga Glen is not as steep as Glen Leigh; both glens are almost entirely in the Huntley Mountain Formation, with a small region at the southern end, including Waters Meet, in the Catskill Formation.
 
There is also the  Ganoga View Trail, which leads from Pennsylvania Route 487 in the west to Ganoga Falls. The Highland Trail, which meets the Falls Trail a short distance north of Mohawk Falls, is the  connector between the northern ends of Ganoga Glen and Glen Leigh.

Jeff Mitchell writes in Hiking the Endless Mountains: Exploring the Wilderness of Northeast Pennsylvania that Ganoga Glen has his "favorite place" in the park: "Here the trail wraps around ledges and underneath overhanging rocks, right next to the waterfalls. The roar of the falls reverberates against their rocky confines. The state park trail map says that Seneca, Delaware, and Mohican Falls are here, but it is hard to discern which falls are which because they explode from everywhere and are continuous."

Note

a.

References

Works cited

 ISBN refers to a 1999 reprint edition, URL is for the Susquehanna River Basin Commission's web page of Native American Place names, quoting and citing the book

 (Note: OCLC refers to the 1961 First Edition).

External links

  
  
  
,

Ricketts Glen State Park
Landforms of Luzerne County, Pennsylvania
Ricketts Glen State Park, Waterfalls
Ricketts Glen State Park, Waterfalls
Articles containing video clips